Orm and Cheep is a 1980s British children's television series that was aimed at the younger viewers of Children's ITV. It used puppets as the main characters (Orm being a worm and Cheep being a bird) and was narrated by Richard Briers. The show was created by Tony Martin, the puppets created by Mary Edwards. There were a total of 26 episodes, which spanned between the years of 1984–1987, each episode consisting of eleven minutes. The series was aired in the United Kingdom, New Zealand, Canada and Iran.

Plot 
Cheep was an infant bird who fell from his nest, prior to learning to fly (the theme tune, "If only Cheep could fly", ensured that Cheep's difficulties in learning to fly became a recurring joke throughout the series). He befriends Orm, a worm who inhabits a subterranean home. Their acquaintances include Snail and Mouse, all friends and foes have a single-word, noun name. Their notable foes include Rat and Crow, who often scheme to consume the pair.

Episodes

Series 1
The Fall (10.04.1984)
A Piece of Cake (17.04.1984)
Cat Nap (24.04.1984)
Down to Earth (01.05.1984)
Don't Sneeze Please (08.05.1984)
Eye, Eye! (15.05.1984)
Strawberry Patch (22.05.1984)
Cat and Mouse (29.05.1984)
A House for Mouse (05.06.1984)
What a Rat (12.06.1984)
Silvery Trail (19.06.1984)
Cheep Skate (26.06.1984)
The Search Party (03.07.1984)

Series 2
Water, Water Everywhere (5.03.1987)
Spring Clean (12.03.1987)
Gone with the Wind (19.03.1987)
Buried Treasure (26.03.1987)
The Dark Wood (02.04.1987)
Sports Day (09.04.1987)
Ghosts (16.04.1987)
Falling Leaves (23.04.1987)
The Scarecrow (30.04.1987)
The Terrible Three (07.05.1987)
Cricket Tea (14.05.1987)
Rat Trap (21.05.1987)
Blow Out (28.05.1987)

Cast/Crew 
First series
Creator - Tony Martin
Director - Jan Martin
Producer - Jan Martin
Executive Producer - David Hamilton
Artistic Director - Tony Martin
Puppet creator _ Mary Edwards
Writer - Guy Hallifax
Narrator - Richard Briers
Puppeteers - Mary Edwards, Geoff Felix and Ian Thom

Australian VHS releases 
 Roadshow Entertainment (2000)

DVD release 
In 2019, Universal Pictures Home Entertainment (as DreamWorks Classics) announced it would be releasing the entire first series on DVD (Region 2, PAL format).

References 
Jedi's Children's TV. Jedi. 10 Feb. 2005.
25 Feb. 2007 

Toon Hound. Frazer Diamond. 11 Aug. 2006. 25 Feb. 2007 

1984 British television series debuts
1987 British television series endings
1980s British children's television series
ITV children's television shows
TVNZ 2 original programming
British preschool education television series
Television series by ITV Studios
British television shows featuring puppetry
English-language television shows